The 1969 season was Djurgårdens IF's 69th in existence, their 24th season in Allsvenskan and their 7th consecutive season in the league. They were competing in Allsvenskan, 1968–69 Svenska Cupen and 1969–70 Svenska Cupen.

Player statistics
Appearances for competitive matches only.

|}

Goals

Total

Allsvenskan

Svenska Cupen

Competitions

Overall

Allsvenskan

League table

Matches

Svenska Cupen

1968–69 Svenska Cupen

1969–70 Svenska Cupen

Friendlies

References

Djurgårdens IF Fotboll seasons
Djurgarden